A Son de Guerra (English: to the beat of war) is the 11th studio album recorded by Dominican singer-songwriter Juan Luis Guerra, It was released by Capitol Latin on June 8, 2010 (see 2010 in music).  The album contains 11 tracks, and its musical structure and production are based on Merengue, Bachata, Son, Salsa and incorporates jazz, blues, cumbia, rock, reggae, rap, and mambo styles. Lyrical themes on the album include protest against political corruption, immigration, love and romance. Featured appearances include Juanes and Chris Botti. For many fans and critics alike, it's his album with the most social content and strong social criticism since his 1992's Areito.

A Son de Guerra met with positive reviews by the critics. It won three awards including Album of the Year on November 11, 2010, at the 11th Annual Latin Grammy Awards and was nominated Best Tropical Latin Album at 53rd Annual Grammy Awards. The album was support by six official singles: Bachata en Fukuoka which won Best Tropical Song at the 11th Latin Grammy Awards, Mi Bendicion, La Guagua, La Calle, Lola`s Bambo and Apaga y Vamonos.

A Son de Guerra debuted at number one on the Billboard Tropical Albums. It remained the top-selling album on the chart for 9 weeks and was certified platinum (Latin field) in the United States by the Recording Industry Association of America (RIAA). It top the charts in Spain and Uruguay and reached the top 10 in Chile, Colombia, Ecuador, Mexico, Peru and Venezuela. It was certified gold and platinum in Mexico and Venezuela. To promote the album, Guerra embarked on the A Son de Guerra World Tour. In 2013, Guerra released A Son de Guerra Tour, recorded live during the tour stop in Santo Domingo the previous year.

Background and production
By the end of 2009, Guerra concluded his Travesia Tour which he performed in countries such as Japan for the first time. At the end of the tour, the artist stated that he wanted to do something different in comparison to his other works. By 2010, Juan Luis Guerra had sold over 20 million copies worldwide. On March 22, 2010, Guerra released the lead single "Bachata en Fukuoka" and he explained that he got the inspiration of the lyrics during his stop of his previous in the city of the same name in Japan.

On May 25, 2010, Guerra revealed to the press "Perhaps it is the most varied album in terms of musical genres, in others I have made two or three fusions, in this one I have made a deeper mix". Also, it explained first time he mixed seven music genres: bachata, merengue, mambo, jazz, cumbia, son and rock and also that he returned to do social content on his music.

Musical style, writing and composition 
The album contains 11 tracks in total.  The opening track "No aparecen" is a romantic merengue. "La Guagua" is a son with elements of cumbia  and guracha with a strong with a political message and is a reflection about the poverty and political corruption in Latin America. Mi bendicion is a bachata song that talks about the blessing of been love. "La Calle" feat Juanes, is a rock song with also contains social criticism. "Bachata en Fukuoka" is a romantic bachata song. "Apaga y Vamonos" is a merengue song that contains social criticism and reflects about how the poverty, corruption and poor conditions had stayed the same. "Son del Rey" is Christian song with an infectious Cuban son rhythm. Cayo Arena is a merengue with strong influences of jazz and blues.

"Arregla Los Papeles" is an intricate salsa that talks about immigration. "Lola`s Mambo" is a salsa song with elements of mambo. Caribbean Blues is son song and is his first English language song since "Medicine for my soul" on his 10th studio album La Llave la de mi corazon.

Critical reception 
A Son de Guerra it was one of the most anticipated Latin albums for the summer of 2010. The album met with positive reviews. Jason Birchmeier of Allmusic gave the album a positive review, and while he felt that "there's nothing extravagant here", he stated that "every song is interesting from one standpoint or another."

At the 11th Latin Grammy Awards the album won three awards: Best Tropical Song, Best Contemporary Tropical Album and Album of the Year for his “A Son de Guerra. At the 2011 Premio Lo Nuestro, he was the most nominated artist with six. Eventually he won best merengue artist. At the 27th Annual Soberano Awards, previously Casandra awards, Guerra won two awards including album of the year for A Son de Guerra. The album received a nomination for Best Tropical Latin Album at 53rd Annual Grammy Awards.

Commercial performance 
In the United States, A son de Guerra debuted at number two on the Billboard Top Latin Albums and number one Billboard Tropical Albums on the week of 26 June 2010. Also, It debut at 52 on US Billboard 200. It was certified platinum (latin field) by the RIAA for shipping 100,000 copies in the United States. In Mexico, the album peaked a number six and was certified gold for selling over 30,000 copies.

In Chile, it peaked at number 7 and number 6 in Colombia at albums retail charts. In Peru, it peaked at number 9 at the albums retail albums charts. In Spain, A son de Guerra debuted at number one on the albums charts. In Uruguay, the album debuted at number one at the album monthly charts. In Ecuador, the album reached number 5 on the retail charts and sold over 5,000 copies. In Venezuela, it reached number 2 at the albums retail charts and was certified platinum.

Credits and personnel 

Adam Ayan – mastering
Patricio Bonilla – trombone
David Channing – engineer
Vinnie Colaiuta – drums
Juan De La Cruz – bongos, conga, maracas, Timbals, guiro
Abednego DeLos Santos – electric bass
Jose Fléte – trombone
Rafael "Rafo" German – guira
Juan Luis Guerra – producer, arrangements
Jeremías King – electric bass
Rafael Lazzaro – engineer
Allan Leschhorn – engineer
Luis Mansilla – engineer
Adalgisa Pantaleon – chorus
Apolinar Peralta – trombone
Juan Rizek – Chorus
Frank Rodriguez – assistant engineer
Janina Rosado – piano, producer, engineer, chorus, synth
Allen Sides – engineer
Ruben Toribio – electric bass
Carlos Torres – trombone
David Torres – mixing assistant
Ronnie Torres – engineer, mixing, mastering supervisor
Roger Zayas – chorus

Tracklist

Chart performance

Sales and certifications

See also
List of number-one albums of 2010 (Spain)
List of number-one Billboard Tropical Albums of 2010

References

2010 albums
Juan Luis Guerra albums
Latin Grammy Award winners for Album of the Year
Capitol Latin albums
Latin Grammy Award for Best Contemporary Tropical Album